Hidalgo Municipality may refer to the following municipalities in Mexico:
Hidalgo Municipality, Coahuila
Hidalgo Municipality, Michoacán - Municipal seat: Ciudad Hidalgo, Michoacán
Hidalgo Municipality, Durango
Hidalgo Municipality, Tamaulipas
See also
Hidalgo (disambiguation)

Municipality name disambiguation pages